Yuri Fedorov (born July 8, 1949) is a Russian retired ice hockey defenceman. He played in the Soviet Hockey League for CSKA Moscow and Torpedo (Gorky) which is now known as Torpedo Nizhny Novgorod. He also played in the Japan Ice Hockey League for Oji Seishi. He was inducted into the Russian and Soviet Hockey Hall of Fame in 1978.

External links

 
 Russian and Soviet Hockey Hall of Fame bio

1949 births
HC CSKA Moscow players
Living people
Oji Eagles players
Sportspeople from Ulyanovsk
Russian ice hockey coaches
Soviet ice hockey defencemen
Torpedo Nizhny Novgorod players